Tuulo Habreed is a town in the Misraq Gashamo woreda, in the Somali Region of Ethiopia.

References 

Populated places in the Somali Region